Good Luck Charlie, It's Christmas! (also known as Good Luck Charlie: The Road Trip Movie in the United Kingdom and Ireland) is a 2011 American Christmas road comedy television film directed by Arlene Sanford and written by Geoff Rodkey, based on the Disney Channel Original Series Good Luck Charlie by Phil Baker and Drew Vaupen. The Disney Channel Original Movie stars Bridgit Mendler, Leigh-Allyn Baker, Bradley Steven Perry, Mia Talerico, Eric Allan Kramer, and Jason Dolley as the Duncan family. It follows the Duncan family as they prepare for their Christmas trip to Amy Duncan's parents' house in Palm Springs, California. Things goes awry however when Teddy and Amy find themselves separated from their family after Teddy gives up her seat in exchange for a free plane ticket. With only a few days left until Christmas, the duo will have to face numerous obstacles as they embark on a hitchhiking journey across Utah and Nevada to get to California so they can reunite with their family in time for the holidays.

The plot point of the film where Amy Duncan is revealed to pregnant would be carried to the third season, where she would give birth in the episode "Special Delivery", marking the introduction of the fifth Duncan family member, Toby Duncan. The film was produced by It's a Laugh Productions (uncredited) and Salty Pictures and distributed by Disney-ABC Domestic Television. On December 2, 2011, the film premiered on Disney Channel, receiving a total of 6.9 million viewers upon its original airing.

Plot
The Duncan family plans to go to Amy's parents' new condo in Palm Springs, California for Christmas. As the family are sorting out their luggage, Teddy's friend Ivy Wentz drops by their house and reminds Teddy about their plan to go to Florida for spring break. Teddy asks Amy for permission, but she denies, unwilling to let her daughter travel alone. At Denver International Airport, Teddy still begs for her parents to let her go with Ivy. Bob tells Teddy that if she is responsible enough to get a plane ticket, then she can be responsible enough to go to Florida on her own. After some mishap involving the airport's metal detector, the Duncan family quickly make it on board the plane for Palm Springs.

As they are all prepared for their flight, a flight attendant informs the passengers that one of the plane's seats has been overbooked and asks for any passenger to give up their seat voluntarily, in exchange for a free plane ticket. Seeing this as an opportunity to go to Florida with Ivy, Teddy volunteers to give up her seat for the ticket. Still refusing to let Teddy go by herself, Amy also gets off the plane to go after her. Back at the airport, Amy learns from a check-in desk woman that the next flight to Palm Springs won't be available for three days, which is after Christmas. Appalled by this, Amy gets in a little confrontation with the desk woman and proceeds to assault her, causing her and Teddy to get thrown out by airport security. Separated from their family and with only about three days left until Christmas, Amy begins to panic but Teddy suggests that they should take the bus to get to Palm Springs.

Meanwhile, the rest of the family arrives in Palm Springs, but things aren't any easier for them either as Bob tries to care for Charlie under the watchful eye of Amy's mother Petunia, who strongly dislikes Bob and constantly blames him for the kids' mishaps; Charlie making a huge mess and breaking everything in the house, PJ getting a bad sunburn after accidentally using suntan oil instead of sunblock; and Gabe teaching Grandpa Hank how to play his favorite video game, Galaxy of Death, only for Hank to become more addicted to it than he is, causing his hair to be full of mints at one point. During their bus journey, Amy starts suffering from travel sickness, resulting in her and Teddy getting forced off the bus due to the passengers being disgusted by Amy hogging the bathroom.

Stranded and in desperation, Teddy and Amy find unconventional ways to get to Palm Springs before Christmas, while keeping in contact with Bob via mobile phone. They try to rent a worn-out Yugo from a guy who bought the store from its original owner, they end up going down a hill with one windshield wiper and no brakes or headlights and the car gets destroyed when trying to adjust their seats in the morning. With the broken car being towed away to the scrapyard, Teddy suggests that they should hitch a ride, despite Amy's refusal, and the two meet an elderly couple who are part of an alien abduction group called the "Alien Abduction Survivors Network". While riding in the couple's minivan, Amy is revealed to be pregnant again when the elderly woman notices the symptoms, shocking Teddy.

When they arrive in Las Vegas, Nevada, Teddy, who is shocked by the revelation, asks Amy why she didn't tell her about it and Amy explains to Teddy that she and Bob originally planned on announcing her pregnancy to the whole family on Christmas, but then they notice their luggage has been stolen when weren't looking. At the condo swimming pool, Bob gets a phone call from Amy about her and Teddy's situation, which prompts him to drive to Las Vegas to pick up the two as he borrows Hank's car, with PJ and Gabe tagging along while having Petunia look after Charlie while they're gone. While walking through the streets, Amy and Teddy get into another argument. Amy blames Teddy for getting them lost in the first place, and Teddy retorts that Amy's ego combined with her pregnancy has been more hindrance than help. Losing her patience, Amy accidentally blames Teddy for ruining Christmas when she disembarked the plane. Extremely hurt, Teddy disowns Amy as her mother and storms off in tears while Amy becomes ashamed over her actions. Hungry, the mother and daughter do a street performance involving Christmas carols mixed with staged fights to get money for dinner.

In a restaurant, Teddy and Amy encounter Jordan, the girl who had stolen their luggage, and confront her. She breaks down in tears and explains how she became stranded after running away from home to go to a cross-country music festival, which her mother forbade her from attending and was abandoned by her ride. Sympathizing with Jordan, Amy calls Jordan's mother and smooths things over, and Teddy gives her plane ticket to Jordan to help her get back home for Christmas. This gesture helps Teddy and Amy reconcile from their previous arguments, and Amy finally acknowledges that Teddy is responsible as they rent a bike from a bike rental store owner, who just so happens to the original owner of the car rental store that he sold.

Meanwhile, as PJ, Bob, and Gabe are driving through a desert, they find themselves mistakenly kidnapped by a red-colored team of paintball match participants who tie the trio up in their base, thinking that they're trying to take the Stone of Mitrios, a huge kryptonite-like rock that decides the winning side. Knowing what's going on, Gabe explains how Chuck Jablowsky, the multi-gazillionaire creator of Galaxy of Death, also owns his own game-based paintball-tournament that he holds every Christmas Eve. They manage to get untied (With the help of PJ who got free easily thanks to the sunburn ointment) and Gabe decides that they should participate in the tournament in order to return to the car. Using his knowledge of the game, Gabe wins the match and even meets Jablowsky himself. Out of gratitude for them wearing the same uniforms as his yellow team, Chuck offers the trio a free helicopter ride to find Teddy and Amy at a diner that the two had arrived at after biking all night from Las Vegas.

Hank and Petunia also arrive with Charlie by car, having gone looking for the boys and Hank's car after they didn't come back, and the entire family is finally reunited. Petunia even reveals that she found a star-shaped tree topper, which Amy lost earlier in the film, that got stuck in Charlie's car seat mechanism. As the family begin their Christmas celebration in the diner, Amy admits not only that they finally got the Christmas vacation they wanted, but also that this was the best Christmas they've ever had, which helps her and Teddy make up. Amy then announces that she is having another baby, much to the excitement of both the Duncans and the Blankenhoopers.

In the epilogue, on the way back home to Denver, Colorado, Gabe attempts to bring the Stone of Mitrios on the plane ride back, but it is taken away by a flight attendant. Another flight attendant then announces the offering of a free plane ticket, which Teddy quickly accepts once again. Amy says to Bob, "Your turn" and Bob obediently goes after Teddy, jokingly promising Amy that they will be back by New Year's Day. Amy smiles in response and says that she knows they won't. A short blooper roll follows the epilogue during the end credits.

Cast

 Bridgit Mendler as Teddy, the older sister of Charlie who makes video diaries.
 Leigh-Allyn Baker as Amy, Teddy's comedic and headstrong mother.
 Bradley Steven Perry as Gabe, Teddy's mischievous younger brother.
 Mia Talerico as Charlie, the toddler the diaries are for.
 Debra Monk as Petunia, Amy's mother.
 Michael Kagan as Hank, Amy's father.
 Eric Allan Kramer as Bob, Teddy's father.
 Jason Dolley as P.J., Teddy's goofy and airheaded older brother.

 Raven Goodwin as Ivy, Teddy's best friend in Denver. 
 Abbie Cobb as Jordan, a lost girl whom Teddy and Amy encounter in Las Vegas. 
 Pamela Dunlap as Sue, an older woman who allows Teddy and Amy to hitchhike with her.
 David Wells as Stan, Sue's husband.
 Joey Nader as Daryl, a car dealer.
 E.E. Bell as Lenny, a car repairman.
 Ernie Grunwald as Walter, a bike shop owner.

Production
The film was executive-produced by Sheri Singer along with three executive producers of the series, Dan Staley, Phil Baker and Drew Vaupen. The script was written by Geoff Rodkey and directed by Arlene Sanford. The film was shot in Salt Lake City and St. George, Utah from March 2011 to September 2011. The Gateway complex in Salt Lake City was used to film scenes that were set on the Las Vegas Strip. Other filming locations included the Pirate Island pizza restaurant in Orem, which stood in as a Las Vegas buffet; and the Salt Palace convention center, which was transformed to look like the Denver Airport. Filming also took place at Skull Valley.

Music

"I'm Gonna Run to You", performed by Bridgit Mendler, who also did performed the Good Luck Charlie opening theme song, was released as promotional single on November 18, 2011. It was written by Bridget Mendler and Jamie Houston and produced by Houston. "Jingle Bells", "We Wish You a Merry Christmas" and "Deck the Halls" were also performed during the movie.

Release

Broadcast 
The film aired worldwide on Disney Channel. It premiered on December 2, 2011, in Canada, on December 16, 2011, in Australia, New Zealand, Ireland, and the United Kingdom. It aired in Singapore, Malaysia and the Philippines on December 24, 2011.

Home media 
The movie was released on iTunes on December 6, 2011. An exclusive edition of the movie was released on DVD only through Walmart on October 23, 2012.

Reception

Critical Response 
Emily Ashby of Common Sense Media gave the film 4 out of 5 rating, writing: "Good Luck Charlie fans have reason to celebrate this holiday special, which hones in on the most appealing aspects of the popular sitcom and glams them up for the festivities. Amy's frazzled nerves, Bob's fumbling efforts to hold things together, and the kids' determination to chart their own courses are the catalyst for the movie's plentiful funny moments… and that's not even counting the impish toddler who throws their lives into turmoil at every turn. In other words, there's no shortage of laughs in this merry movie that will appeal to parents almost as much as it does their kids.

Happily, there's also a heartier side to the story, one that reflects what parents (if not their offspring) hold dear through the holidays. This is a kid-targeted movie that spends two anticipatory hours building up to Christmas but makes no references to gifts, stockings, or even Santa. Instead, the focus is on the family, and rather than fighting crowds for the must-have toys of the year, these family members are racing the clock just to spend time with their loved ones. Feel-good messages nestled within the movie's shiny packaging -- plus a few Christmas surprises -- make this one to add to your family's watch list. If nothing else, it's a great way to shed the stress of the season by getting some laughs at a different family's dysfunction."

Ratings 
It was watched by 6.9 million viewers, the premiere also delivered 3.3 million kids 6–11, 2.4 million teens and 1.4 million adults 18–49. The movie became no. 1 live-action cable movie of 2011 in total viewers and the no. 1 live-action scripted telecast across all TV in kids 6–11. In Australia it was watched by 111,000 viewers and in the United Kingdom there were 562,000 viewers.

See also 

 Good Luck Charlie
 List of Christmas films

References

External links

 
 

2011 television films
2011 films
2010s teen comedy films
American Christmas comedy films
Christmas television films
Disney Channel Original Movie films
Films based on television series
Films directed by Arlene Sanford
Films set in California
Films shot in Utah
American comedy road movies
2010s comedy road movies
Good Luck Charlie
American teen comedy films
American comedy television films
Television films based on television series
2010s Christmas comedy films
2010s American films